Taverny is a commune in the northwestern suburbs of Paris, France.

Inhabitants are called Tabernaciens.

History
In 1806 the commune of Taverny merged with the neighboring commune of Saint-Leu, resulting in the creation of the commune of Saint-Leu-Taverny.

In 1821 the commune of Saint-Leu-Taverny was demerged. Thus, Taverny and Saint-Leu were both restored as separate communes.

On 30 March 1922, a part of the territory of Taverny was detached and merged with a part of the territory of Montigny-lès-Cormeilles and a part of the territory of Pierrelaye to create the commune of Beauchamp.

Florence Portelli was elected Mayor of Taverny in 2014, and re-elected in 2020.

Population

Transport
Taverny is served by two stations on the Transilien Paris-Nord suburban rail line: Vaucelles and Taverny.

Air force base 921

Air force base 921 which hosts the commanders of the French airborne nuclear dissuasion force is situated in former quarries under the Montmorency forest in the commune of Taverny.

See also
Communes of the Val-d'Oise department

References

External links

Official website 

Association of Mayors of the Val d'Oise 

Communes of Val-d'Oise